Hanane Aït El Haj (born 2 November 1994) is a Moroccan footballer who plays as a forward for AS FAR and the Morocco women's national team.

International career
Aït El Haj capped for Morocco at senior level during the 2018 Africa Women Cup of Nations qualification (first round).

See also
List of Morocco women's international footballers

References

External links
Hanane Aït El Haj at BDFútbol

1994 births
Living people
People from Agadir
Moroccan women's footballers
Women's association football forwards
AS FAR (football) players
Zaragoza CFF players
Segunda Federación (women) players
Morocco women's international footballers
Moroccan expatriate footballers
Moroccan expatriate sportspeople in Spain
Expatriate women's footballers in Spain